HDMS Triton is a  frigate belonging to the Royal Danish Navy. It is being used to exercise the Danish sovereignty over the waters around Greenland and the Faroe Islands.

History
On 19 December 2006, the Triton participated in the rescue operation of the crew of the cargo ship Wilson Muuga after it ran aground south of Sandgerði on the Reykjanes peninsula. During the operation, eight sailors from the Triton went into the sea after their rigid inflatable boat overturned in rough seas. Seven of the men where rescued by Icelandic Coast Guard helicopter TF-LÍF while one died.

References

Thetis-class ocean patrol vessels
Ships built in Svendborg
1990 ships
Frigates of Denmark